Giancarlo Perini (born 2 December 1959 in Carpaneto Piacentino) is a former Italian cyclist.

Major results
1979
Gran Premio Industria e Commercio Artigianato Carnaghese
1987
2nd stage Tour de France (TTT)
1992
2nd Coppa Bernocchi
8th Tour de France
1993
3rd stage Giro di Puglia
2nd Gran Premio Città di Camaiore

Grand Tour Results
Source:

Tour de France
1984: 81st
1985: 105th
1987: 102nd
1989: 102nd
1990: 99th
1991: 120th
1992: 8th
1993: 29th
1994: 54th
1995: 87th

Vuelta a España
1981: 45th

Giro d'Italia
1984: DNF
1985: 73rd
1989: 56th
1990: 36th
1991: 85th
1992: 42nd
1993: 76th
1994: 57th
1995: 63rd

References

1959 births
Living people
Italian male cyclists
Sportspeople from the Province of Piacenza
Cyclists from Emilia-Romagna